The Swedish Athletics Association (Swedish Svenska Friidrottsförbundet) is the governing body for the sport of athletics in Sweden. It was established in Göteborg on 30 October 1895.

Affiliations 
World Athletics
European Athletic Association (EAA)
Swedish Olympic Committee

National records 
SFIF maintains the Swedish records in athletics.

References

External links 
Official webpage 

Sweden
Athletics
National governing bodies for athletics
Sports organizations established in 1895
1895 establishments in Sweden